Ranelagh Gardens (alternative spellings include Ranelegh and Ranleigh, the latter reflecting the English pronunciation) were public pleasure gardens located in Chelsea, then just outside London, England, in the 18th century.

History
The Ranelagh Gardens were so called because they occupied the site of Ranelagh House, built in 1688–89 by The 1st Earl of Ranelagh, an Anglo-Irish peer who was the Treasurer of Chelsea Hospital (1685–1702), immediately adjoining the hospital; according to Bowack's Antiquities of Middlesex (1705), it was "Designed and built by himself". Its actual builder and owner was one Solomon Rieti, an Italian Jewish immigrant. Rieti's niece, Rebecca Rieti, was the grandmother of Benjamin Disraeli. Ranelagh House was demolished in 1805 (Colvin 1995, p. 561).  The original Ranelagh was one of the  Earl's Irish estates: a similar pleasure garden was opened near Dublin city, and this gives its name to the present-day suburb of Ranelagh.

In 1741, the house and grounds were purchased by a syndicate led by the proprietor of the Theatre Royal, Drury Lane, and Sir Thomas Robinson MP, and the gardens opened to the public the following year. Ranelagh was considered more fashionable than its older rival Vauxhall Gardens; the entrance charge was two shillings and sixpence, compared to a shilling at Vauxhall. Horace Walpole wrote soon after the gardens opened, "It has totally beat Vauxhall... You can't set your foot without treading on a Prince, or Duke of Cumberland." Ranelagh Gardens introduced the masquerade, formerly a private, aristocratic entertainment, to a wider, middle-class English public, where it was open to commentary by essayists and writers of moral fiction.

The centrepiece of Ranelagh was a rococo rotunda, which figured prominently in views of Ranelagh Gardens taken from the river. It had a diameter of 120 feet (37 metres) and was designed by William Jones, a surveyor to the East India Company. The central support housed a chimney and fireplaces for use in winter. From its opening, the Rotunda at Ranelagh Gardens was an important venue for musical concerts. In 1765, the nine-year-old Mozart performed in this showplace. Canaletto painted the gardens, and painted the interior of the Rotunda twice, for different patrons.  The rotunda was closed in 1803 and demolished two years later. The organ was moved to All Saints Church, Evesham.

There was also a Chinese pavilion, which was added in 1750, an ornamental lake and several walks. Ranelagh was a popular venue for romantic assignations. Edward Gibbon wrote that it was, "the most convenient place for courtships of every kind — the best market we have in England."

Such was the renown of the gardens and the vogue for music in the open air that a New York Ranelagh Gardens was opened in New York, in the former Rutgers house, as a rival to the New York Vauxhall Gardens; its proprietor John Kenzie posted an advertisement for it during the occupation of the city in the American Revolution, in hopes of attracting the British soldiers, as well as "the Respectable Public", and a Jardin Ranelagh was created in Paris' fashionable 16th arrondissement in 1870.

Ranelagh Gardens were redesigned by John Gibson in the 19th century. It is now a green pleasure ground with shaded walks, part of the grounds of Chelsea Hospital and the site of the annual Chelsea Flower Show.

See also
 Cremorne Gardens – a mid-19th-century public garden. Also in Chelsea, but at the opposite end of the district.
 Ranelagh – a Dublin suburb in which was once located pleasure gardens similar to those in Ranelagh Gardens, London.
 Chelsea Bridge Road – next to Ranelagh Gardens
 Ranelagh Paris

Notes

References
 Colvin, Howard. A Biographical Dictionary of British Architects, 1600–1840, 3rd edition, 1995.
 Weintraub, Stanley. Disraeli: A Biography, New York: Truman Talley Books, 1994.

External links

 A selection of items about Ranelagh Gardens at victorianlondon.org
 Garden visit: Royal Hospital and Ranelagh Gardens
 So What Was Wrong With Ranelagh?, "Jane Austen's London", May 8, 2016

Buildings and structures completed in 1689
Former parks and open spaces of London
Former buildings and structures in the Royal Borough of Kensington and Chelsea
Rococo architecture in England
Pleasure gardens in England
Entertainment in London
Gardens in London
Rotundas in the United Kingdom
1689 establishments in England